Al-Qabu ("the vault, or cellar"), was a Palestinian Arab village in the Jerusalem Subdistrict. The name is an Arabic variation of the site's original Roman name, and the ruins of a church there are thought to date to the era of Byzantine or Crusader rule over Palestine.

Al-Qabu was depopulated on 22–23 October 1948, following the 1948 Arab-Israeli War. Following Israel's establishment, homes in the village were blown up by Israeli troops in May 1949 and in 1950, the moshav of Mevo Beitar was founded on the village lands.

Location

History
During the period of Roman rule over Palestine, the place was known as Qobi or Qobia. The village had a spring, and was located at the tenth milestone on the road constructed between Bayt Jibrin and Jerusalem under emperor Hadrian. The Arabic name of the Palestinian village, al-Qabu, was a modification of the earlier Roman name.

A ruined church by the village was visited by a team from the Survey of Western Palestine in 1873, and they determined that it appeared to date to the period of the Crusades, while other researchers, such as Reverend Dom M. Gisler, OSB in 1939, have determined that it dates to the Byzantine era.

Ottoman era
In 1838, in the Ottoman era, it was noted as a Muslim village in the District of el-'Arkub; Southwest of Jerusalem. Edward Robinson further noted that the village was located "among steep rocky mountains".

In 1856 the village was named el Kabu on Kiepert's map of Palestine published that year.

In 1863 Victor Guérin described the village, "perched like an eagle's nest", and surrounded by gardens.  An  Ottoman   village list from about  1870  found that  kabu had  a population of 28, in  18  houses, though the population count included men, only.

In 1883, the PEF's Survey of Western Palestine (SWP)  described  the village as being of moderate size, situated on a high hill, with houses built of stone. Other features mentioned were the presence of a ruined church on the hillside, southwest of the village, and two springs in the valley to the west.

The village was laid out in a rectangular plan, extending in a north–south direction along the secondary road. The houses in the village were built primarily of stone. A few small shops in the village were located around its main square. Al-Qabu also had a shrine dedicated to one Shaykh Amad al-'Umari that stood southeast of the village site.

British Mandate era
In the 1922 census of Palestine, conducted by the British Mandate authorities,  Qabu had a population 139,  all  Muslims, increasing  in the 1931 census   to 192, still all Muslim;  in a total of  31 houses.

Several springs around the village, including Ayn Tuz and Ayn al-Bayada, provided water for its residents. The Ain esh Sherkiyeh, meaning "The eastern spring", also lay close by.

In the 1945 statistics, Al-Qabu had a population of 260, all Muslims, with a total of 3,806 dunams of land. In 1944-45 the villagers had allocated a total of 1,233 dunums of village land to the cultivation of cereals;  436 dunums  were irrigated or used for orchards. Olive trees covered 30 dunams of land,   while 12 dunams were classified as built-up areas.

1948 and the aftermath
The village apparently changed hands several times in the 1948-1949 period, Morris writes that the village was first depopulated on 22–23 October 1948. However, in March 1949 the IDF mounted a series of major attacks eastwards, in the area of al-Qabu. The aim was to gain more territory, drive concentrations of Arabs eastwards, and create facts on the ground before a scheduled UN survey of Israeli and Jordanian positions. Notwithstanding these orders, the Israeli UN liaison officers were at pains to describe to the UN observers that the military clashes were the result of Arab incursions and attacks. In reality, Israeli troops were given direct orders to take al-Qabu, Khirbet Sanasin, al Jab'a, and Khirbet al-Hamam, even if it meant battling Jordanian troops.

Over the course of their operations, Israeli troops from the Fourth Brigade took several hilltops, and went on to clear the area of Arabs. The force, which was armed with machine-guns and mortars, were ordered to "hit every [adult male] Arab spotted in the area [but] not to harm women and children".

After signing the 1949 Armistice Agreements with Jordan on 3 April, a question arose about the villagers of Al-Qabu and al-Walaja, whose inhabitants had gradually returned. These two villages were in Israeli territory under the Armistice Agreement, and Israel wanted them empty. On 1 May 1949, Israeli troops raided the villagers and blew up the houses. IDF reports that the villagers fled.

In 1950, the moshav of Mevo Beitar was established on land that had belonged to al-Qabu. According to Petersen, remains of the Palestinian village at the site include the church, a mosque, and a shrine for Shaykh Ahmad al-Umari. The mosque is a square structure, with a courtyard, and it appears to be built of stones removed from the old church.

References

Bibliography

  
  
 
 

 

 
 
     
 

 
  Cited in Petersen, 2001

External links
Welcome To al-Qabu
 al-Qabu,  Zochrot
Survey of Western Palestine, Map 17:  IAA, Wikimedia commons 
 Mosque of Sheikh Mahmud el-‘Ajami
Al-Qabu,  from the Khalil Sakakini Cultural Center 
 Al-Qabu,  Palestine Family.net 
 Tour of al-Qabu, 22.1.11, Zochrot

Arab villages depopulated during the 1948 Arab–Israeli War
District of Jerusalem